Sergio Octavio Germán Olivares (born 22 March 1962) is a Mexican politician from the National Action Party. From 2009 to 2012 he served as Deputy of the LXI Legislature of the Mexican Congress representing the State of Mexico.

Political career
Chief coordinator of the Campaign of C. Aaron Urbina Bedolla in the election of November 10, 1996, Secretary of Government Action in the Municipal Steering Committee of the PAN of Tecámac. President of the Municipal Steering Committee in the State of Mexico. Municipal President of Tecámac, State of Mexico. Member of the CDE of the PAN in the state of Mexico. President of the State Steering Committee for the PAN in the State of Mexico. National Councilor of the PAN. Member of the CEN of the PAN.  President of PAN at the Municipal level

Social programs implemented in Tecámac
Social program Food Support, Assistance Program, Scholarships, Improving your Home, DIF Programs Health Hospital 200, CAVVI, URIS, Health Conference Public security CET, Safe School, School without Risk, Circle of Police Excellence Education and sport UPT, CBT # 3, Equipment, Tournaments, Olympics, Championships  Public Works and Services Expansion of the Gallineros Bridge, Paving, Drainage Construction, Rescue of Public Spaces. Public Service  Municipal Cleaning, Purchase of Mechanical Sweepers and Purchase of Hydraulic Cranes for Public Lighting, Work Sources, Construction of Tecámac Power Center, Cedis Coppel, Plaza Mexiquense, Chedraui.

References

1962 births
Living people
Politicians from the State of Mexico
National Action Party (Mexico) politicians
21st-century Mexican politicians
Members of the Chamber of Deputies (Mexico) for the State of Mexico